Vladimir Eduardovich Evzerov (Russian: Владимир Эдуардович Евзеров), born on February 19, 1954, is a Russian music composer, Singer. Meritorious Artist of Russia (2004).

Biography
Vladimir Evzerov was born on February 19, 1954, in Cherkasy, Ukrainian SSR, Soviet Union.

As a composer famous was only after meeting with Valery Leontiev, who began to perform his songs. In reperutare Leontiev more than 30 songs of Evzerov. Subsequently, Evzerov songs into the repertoire of artists such as Joseph Kobzon, Sofia Rotaru, Nikolai Baskov, Philip Kirkorov, Nikolai Karachentsov, Lyubov Uspenskaya, Aziza, Vadim Kozachenko, Tamara Gverdtsiteli, Vitas, Efim Shifrin, Ekaterina Shavrina, Nadezda Krigina, Mark Tishman, Turetsky Choir, Soprano10, Irina Dubcova, Eugene Diatlov, Ugine Eugene, Eugene Onegin, Alexander Rublev, Anna Reznikova. In addition, Vladimir Evzerov himself performs his own songs, cooperating with Nikolai Denisov, Nikolai Zinoviev, Igor Kokhanovsky Alikhanov Sergey, Yuri Baladzharovym, Maria Shemyakova, Piotr Kuznetsov and other poets.

References

External links
Official website 
Vladimir Evzerov biography 
 
 Valery Leontiev in Creative Evening of V.Evzerov (2007)

1954 births
Living people
Russian pop musicians
Russian composers
Russian male composers
Soviet male singers
Russian people of Ukrainian descent
20th-century Russian male singers
20th-century Russian singers